William Robert Murray (25 April 1896–31 March 1990) was a notable New Zealand labourer, policeman and unionist. He was born in Kirkby Stephen, Westmorland, England on 25 April 1896.

References

1896 births
1990 deaths
New Zealand trade unionists
New Zealand police officers
English emigrants to New Zealand